La Favorita is a 1952 Italian anthology film directed by Cesare Barlacchi. It was from the opera of the same name by Gaetano Donizetti.

Plot
The film was made when Sophia Loren was being credited professionally as Sofia Lazzaro and she plays the part of Leonora. Fernando is the son of Baldassarre and has become fond of Leonora.

Baldassarre's daughter has married the king of Castile, Alfonso XI, who took Leonora as his favourite. When Alfonso wins a battle against the Arabs, he offers Fernando a reward, and Fernando asks to marry Leonora. The king orders their marriage, after which Fernand learns of Leonara's past and, feeling dishonoured, retreats to the monastery. Leonora visits Fernando who is moved by her entreatments and is willing to accept her, but Leonora dies from exhaustion.

Cast
 Gino Sinimberghi as Fernando
 Sofia Lazzaro (Loren) as Leonora di Guzman
 Paolo Silveri as King Alfonso XI of Castile
 Alfredo Colella as Baldassarre,  superior of the convent of Saint James of Compostela

References

External links
 

1950s Italian-language films
1952 films
Italian black-and-white films
Italian anthology films
Films scored by Alessandro Cicognini
Films based on operas
Films set in the 14th century
1950s Italian films